The SJFA West Region Championship (known as the McBookie.com West Region Championship for sponsorship reasons) was a Scottish semi-professional football competition run by the West Region of the Scottish Junior Football Association and was the second tier of league competition for its member clubs.

Formerly known as the West of Scotland Super League First Division, the league began in 2002 when top sides from the former Ayrshire and Central Regions agreed to form two combined Super League divisions above the regional competitions. Originally comprising twelve clubs, it was expanded to fourteen after two years as promotion/relegation places were increased.

West Region clubs voted in 2017 to organise all leagues on a regionwide basis and as a result, the second tier Super League First Division was rebranded as the Championship from 2018 onwards and latterly consisted of sixteen clubs. Clubs were promoted to a rebranded Premiership and relegated to a regionwide League One instead of the previous Central and Ayrshire district divisions.

The competition was abolished in 2020 when all SJFA West Region clubs moved to join the newly formed senior West of Scotland Football League.

Final member clubs for the 2019–20 season

Season summaries

References

External links
West Region Super First Division at Non-League Scotland (archive version, 2007-08 membership)

2
2002 establishments in Scotland
Sports leagues established in 2002
2020 disestablishments in Scotland
Sports leagues disestablished in 2020
Defunct football leagues in Scotland
Defunct Scottish Junior Football Association leagues